Christina Lake Aerodrome  is located near Christina Lake, Alberta, Canada.

See also
 Christina Basin Airport

References

Registered aerodromes in Alberta
Transport in the Regional Municipality of Wood Buffalo